Mickey Mouse: The Computer Game, also known as just Mickey Mouse, is an action game developed and published by Gremlin Graphics in 1988 for the Amiga, Amstrad CPC, Atari ST, Commodore 64, and ZX Spectrum.

Plot
Mickey Mouse needs to find and destroy the four evil witches who have stolen Merlin's wand. To do so he must reach the top of each tower of the enchanted castle. After that, Mickey can defeat the evil Ogre King to free Disneyland from an evil spell.

Reception 
The game received mostly positive reviews.

 ACE: 790/1000 (ST)
 Commodore Computing International: 50% (C64)
 Commodore User: 8/10 (C64)
 Computer & Video Games: 7/10 (C64), 8/10 (ST)
 The Games Machine: 65% (C64), 85% (CPC), 89% (ST), 87% (ZX)
 Zzap!64: 85% (Amiga), 72% (C64)

References

External links 
 Mickey Mouse: The Computer Game at MobyGames

1988 video games
Amiga games
Amstrad CPC games
Atari ST games
Commodore 64 games
Disneyland
Mickey Mouse video games
Video games about witchcraft
ZX Spectrum games
Gremlin Interactive games
Video games developed in the United Kingdom